Ishq Par Zor Nahin is a 1970 Hindi romantic movie (based on love triangle story) produced by Suresh Saigal and directed by Ramesh Saigal. The film stars Dharmendra, Sadhana, Biswajeet, Kamini Kaushal, Leela Mishra, Abhi Bhattacharya, Jagdeep, Nadira and Helen. The film's music is by S. D. Burman. This is the only film in which Biswajeet and Sadhana worked together. Similarly, this is the only movie in which Dharmendra and Sadhana worked together. The songs "Ye Dil Diwana Hai", "Mehbooba, Teri Tasveer", "Tum Mujhse Door Chale Jana Na" and "O, Mere Bairagi Bhanwara" were composed by S.D. Burman. The story of the film is similar to Yash Chopra's 1969 classic Aadmi Aur Insaan.

Plot 
Amar Doraiswamy is the only child of multi-millionaire shipping company owner who lives in a palatial house in Goa, India. Amar introduces a close, but poor friend, Ram, to his father, who employs him conditionally. Amar falls in love with a woman named Sushma Rai, and asks Ram to pen a love letter and poem for her. Sushma gets to read the letter and the poem, and thinking that Ram is Amar, falls in love with him. She meets him, and he is also unknowingly attracted to her, both feel that they are inseparable soul-mates. Then Ram gets a shock when he finds out that Sushma is Amar's intended and decides to stay away from her. But Sushma has other plans, for she intends to marry Ram at any cost, not realizing that by doing this, she is placing not only Ram's life, but also the lives of two other individuals, namely Uma Devi and Lalit, in jeopardy.

Cast
Sadhana ... Sushma Rai
Dharmendra ... Ram Kumar
Biswajit Chatterjee ... Amar (as Biswajeet)
Nadira ...	Mrs. Doraiswamy
Leela Mishra ... Ram's Mother (as Leela Misra)
Randhir ... Doraiswamy's business partner
Jagdish Raj ... Rai (as Jagdeeshraj)	
Meena T. ... Lalita (as Meena)
Uday Chandrika ... Dancer / Singer (as Uday Chandrika)
Kamini Kaushal ... Uma Devi
Abhi Bhattacharya ... Doraiswamy
Jagdeep ... Lalit

Soundtrack 
Lyrics: Anand Bakshi

External links 
 

Films scored by S. D. Burman
1970 films
1970s Hindi-language films
Films directed by Ramesh Saigal